Martha Nichols (born 1987) is an American choreographer, dancer, and actress. She took first place in the Capezio A.C.E. Awards in 2016 for her work Tilted.

Early life 
They lived in Brooklyn, NY, and moved to Raleigh, NC when Martha was eight years old. Moved from Brooklyn NY to North Carolina when she was eight years old. Martha studied dance under Christy Curtis at the Pierrette Sadler Danceurs Studio in Raleigh, and later at Curtis's own CC & Company Dance Complex. Nichols mother, Mary Jane, died of a heart attack on June 1, 2005, shortly after Martha graduated from Millbrook High School. She moved in with family friends after her mother's death. At the age of eighteen, she was a guest teacher, performer and choreographer at the Burlington Academy of Dance & Arts in Burlington, NC.

Career 
Nichols appeared on Season 2 of So You Think You Can Dance, which aired beginning in May 2006. She was one of approximately 2000 dancers who auditioned for the season, and was in the Top 20 who appeared on the program. A USA Today article about the show described her as a "contemporary/hip-hop specialist." One of the show's judges, Nigel Lythgoe said "I don't think Martha's got a problem with her career. She's got great sophistication." She finished in the Top 10 for the season, and went on to tour with the other Top 10 finishers after the season finale.

Following her stint on So You Think You Can Dance, Nichols spent two years dancing in Cirque du Soleil's production Criss Angel Believe. She also danced for a Gap commercial and Rihanna's "Diamonds" tour, and she danced and worked as an assistant choreographer on Madonna's Rebel Heart Tour. She danced in the 2016 musical film La La Land and appeared as the "Woman in Gold" in the 2017 film The Greatest Showman. She formed her own dance company, the Martha Nichols Dance Company in 2016.

Her short work Tilted won first place at the 2016 Capezio A.C.E. Awards, which earned her a $15,000 prize and a subsequent performance of her piece. Dance journalist Rachel Rizzuto described Tilted as "funky-fabulous." Nichols went on to choreograph a full-length work, The Wider Sun, which saw its debut at the Beverly O'Neill Theater in Long Beach, California in August 2017. The Wider Sun was her first major choreographic work.

She teaches at the Broadway Dance Center in New York City.

Works 

 Tilted (video)
 The Wider Sun, 2017

See also 
 Martha Nichols on So You Think You Can Dance

References

External links 

 Martha Nichols' YouTube channel - featuring her choreography
Solo performance by Martha Nichols at 2018 Dance Awards Orlando (video)
 
 

1987 births
21st-century American dancers
American women choreographers
American choreographers
American female dancers
Hip hop dancers
Contemporary dancers
Dancers from North Carolina
So You Think You Can Dance contestants
Living people
21st-century American women